The Camellia Bowl was an annual college football postseason game in Sacramento, California, which is nicknamed the Camellia City.  It was held sixteen times at Hughes Stadium, from 1961 through 1975, and once more in 1980.

History
From 1961 through 1963, the game decided the NAIA Football National Championship. From 1964 through 1972, the game was among the four regional finals in the NCAA College Division. There were no playoffs as the national champion was determined by a poll prior to these games; the other three regional finals were the Tangerine (later Boardwalk), Pecan (later Pioneer), and Grantland Rice bowls.

The system was revised in 1973 with the creation of NCAA Division II and its full playoff structure. The Camellia Bowl was the Division II championship game for the first three years before the title game moved to the Pioneer Bowl in Texas. After a four-year hiatus, the Camellia Bowl returned for one year serving in 1980 as the NCAA Division I-AA title game.

Game results

See also
 List of college bowl games

References